Shivarampally is a major commercial and residential area in Hyderabad, Telangana. It provides connectivity to the Rajiv Gandhi International Airport. The P.V. Narasimha Rao Expressway passes through Shivrampally. Nehru Zoological Park, one of the most visited places of Hyderabad, is also the closest place to Shivarampally. The Retail Corporate giants Walmart and Metro Cash and Carry are close to Shivrampally. It is also famous for Ramdev Baba Temple built by Late Shri Gopal Bajaj.

The historic Rukn-ud-Daula lake is located here. This area has gained a lot of investment due to its connectivity to Airport.

Raghvendra Nagar colony is a housing society located in Shivrampally on National Highway 7. Raghvendra Nagar colony is very close to the Inner ring road and has become very popular since the airport has shifted from Begumpet to Shamshabad.

Prestigious Sardar Vallabhbhai Patel National Police Academy is the pride of Hyderabad located in Shivrampally on National Highway 7. Sardar Vallabhbhai Patel National Police Academy is right opposite to Raghvendra Nagar Colony and about five-ten minutes drive from Nehru Zoological Park, Hyderabad. Shivrampally has also one Call Center and MNC located Live Connect.

Neighborhoods

Attapur
Rajendranagar
Budwel
Upparpally
Kattedan
Raghavendra Nagar Colony

Commercial Area

SNC Convention
Wall Mart - Best Price
Cinepolis
TS Paradise Garden
National Police Academy
National Fisheries Development Board
Provident kenworth
SS Convention
Metro cash and Carry

 Mantra Mall - [Max Fashions & Retail [Pantaloons Fashion & Retail]], Stanza, ROMAN ISLAND, Reliance Retail, Neerus
 M Cube Mall

Transport

Shivarampally is well connected to the rest of the city. TSRTC has many services connecting Shivarampally to popular commuter hubs and destinations such as Mehdipatnam (300), Secunderabad (5, 49), Uppal (300), and Koti (95).

References

2. Live Connect Global - Call Center in Shivrampally

Bharthi Walmart Best Price is also located in Shivrampally

Villages in Ranga Reddy district